Estonian Employees' Unions' Confederation (TALO) is a trade union in Estonia. It is affiliated with the European Trade Union Confederation.

See also

References

External links
 Official website

Trade unions in Estonia
European Trade Union Confederation
1992 establishments in Estonia
Trade unions established in 1992